Caulfield is a surname of several separate origins. The name is usually a simplified form of a number of Gaelic surnames, often MacCathmhaoil, an Ulster family traditionally descended from Niall of the Nine Hostages. Also known to be an anglicized form of Mac Eoghain, Mac Caomhanaigh, O'Gamhnain, and O'Gamhna. Occasionally confused with Caulfeild, an unrelated Anglo-Irish family. People with this surname include:

Andrew Caulfield, Scottish Boxer
Aodh Mac Cathmhaoil, Irish Franciscan theologian and Archbishop of Armagh
Barbara A. Caulfield, United States District Judge of the United States District Court for the Northern District of California
Billy Caulfield, English footballer
Bernard G. Caulfield, U.S. Representative from Illinois
Bernard Caulfield, British barrister and High Court judge
Bernadette Caulfield, American television producer
Brian Caulfield, COO, TeamSnap
Brian Caulfield, Irish venture capitalist and entrepreneur
Brian Caulfield, Professor, University College Dublin
Brian Caulfield, Professor, Trinity College Dublin
Brian Caulfield, Vice Postulator for Sainthood Cause of Blessed Michael McGivney, founder of the Knights of Columbus
Brian Mac Cathmhaoil, Bishop of Clogher
Brian Mac Cathmhaoil, Lord of Kinel Farry
Carlota Caulfield, Author, Professor of Spanish and Spanish American Studies at Mills College
Cathal Caulfield, Irish musician
Cole Caufield, Professional Hockey player
Elizabeth Jane Caulfeild, Countess of Charlemont, wife of the 3rd Earl of Charlemont
Emma Caulfield, actress in Buffy the Vampire Slayer
Emmet Caulfield, Irish footballer
Finbar Caulfield, Irish footballer
Francis William Caulfeild, 2nd Earl of Charlemont (1775–1863)
Frank J. Caufield, founder of venture capital firm Kleiner Perkins Caufield & Byers
Frank Caulfield, Irish professional boxer
Henry S. Caulfield, former Governor of Missouri
Holden Caulfield, main character of the novel Catcher In The Rye
Jake Caulfield, Professional Baseball Player
James Caulfeild, 1st Earl of Charlemont (1728–1799)
James Caulfeild, 3rd Earl of Charlemont (1820–1892)
Jay Caufield, former NHL right winger
Jo Caulfield, British comedian
Joan Caulfield, American post-World War II actress
John Caulfeild (1661–1707), son of William Caulfeild
John Caulfield, Irish footballer
Jack Caulfield, member of the Richard Nixon administration, assistant director of criminal enforcement at the U.S. Bureau of Alcohol, Tobacco, Firearms and Explosives
Joseph Caulfield James, tutor to Prince Vajiravudh of Thailand
Louisa Caulfield, known as Mrs Caulfield, English music hall singer
Maxine Caulfield, main character of the video game Life Is Strange
Maria Caulfield, member of parliament, UK
Martin Caulfield, Gaelic footballer
Mary Teresa Caulfield, victim, September 11 terrorist attacks
 Matthew Caulfield, Major General, U.S. Marine Corps
Maxwell Caulfield, actor
Oisin Caulfield, Irish footballer
Patrick Caulfield, British artist
Patrick Caulfield, discoverer of Céide Fields
Patrick Caulfield, marketing director, O'Shaughnessy Distilling
Robert Caulfield, tried for being part of "The Defenders" a Roman Catholic agrarian secret society and sentenced to 7 years in penal servitude in Australia, later escaped to Brazil. 
Seamas Caulfield, Irish archaeologist
Sean Caulfield, Canada Research Chair and professor of Printmaking in the Department of Art and Design at the University of Alberta
Serena Caulfield, Irish painter
Sidney Caulfield (1877–1964), English architect
Thomas Caulfield, CEO, GlobalFoundries
Thomas "Tommy" Caulfield, musician, director of "Erin's Prize Orchestra," radio broadcaster and promoter of traditional Irish music
Thomas J. Caulfield, American architect
Thomas Caulfeild or Caulfield, British Lieutenant-Governor of Nova Scotia
 Thomas Caulfield (actor) (1766–1815), a British stage actor
Timothy Caulfield, Professor in the Faculty of Law and the School of Public Health, University of Alberta
William Caulfeild, 1st Viscount Charlemont (1624–1671)
William Caulfeild, 2nd Viscount Charlemont (–1726)

See also
 Caulfield (disambiguation)

References